Ezio Marano (6 August 1927, Brescia – 26 April 1991, Rome) was an Italian actor.

Biography 
He made his debut in the theater in the mid-50s at the Piccolo Teatro in Milan under the guidance of Giorgio Strehler, in a long series of performances in both Italian and the Lombard dialect; he then entered into more and more companies in smaller but significant parts, working simultaneously on television and Radio Rai. For television, he was among the performers on the TV drama , directed by Vittorio Cottafavi in 1973.

He made his debut in the cinema comparatively late, in 1969, under the direction of Mauro Severino, and continued his film career, with his last movie being Ginger and Fred, directed by Federico Fellini in 1985. He died on 26 April 1991 by a lingering disease that had struck him three years earlier.

Radio 
 Santa Giovanna, by George Bernard Shaw, directed by Sandro Bolchi, directed by 19 June 1956.

Television 
 Anna von Barnheim, ovvero la fortuna del soldato, directed by Flaminio Bollini, transmitted on 17 June 1963.
 La miliardaria, directed by Giuliana Berlinguer, 1972.

Theatre 
 Arlecchino servitore di due padroni, by Carlo Goldoni, directed by Giorgio Strehler, in Edimburgo on 27 August 1956.
 La visita della vecchia signora, by Friedrich Dürrenmatt, directed by Strehler, played at the Piccolo Theatre in Milan, 31 January 1960.
 Così è se vi pare, by Luigi Pirandello, directed by Mario Ferrero, in theatres from 1963 to 1964.

Filmography 

 Mangiala (1968) - Boroni
 Vergogna schifosi  (1969, directed by Mauro Severino) - Artusi - friend of Lea
 Lo chiamavano Trinità (1970, directed by E.B. Clucher) - Frank Faina / Weasel
 Una prostituta al servizio del pubblico e in regola con le leggi dello stato (1969, directed by Italo Zingarelli)
 Una lucertola con la pelle di donna (1971, directed by Lucio Fulci) - Lowell (scientific squad)
 La tarantola dal ventre nero (1971, directed by Paolo Cavara) - Masseur
 Scipione detto anche l'Africano (1971, directed by Luigi Magni) - Gaio Scribonio
 La classe operaia va in paradiso (1971, directed by Elio Petri) - Timekeeper
 Maddalena (1971, directed by Jerzy Kawalerowicz)
 Questa specie d'amore (1972, directed by Alberto Bevilacqua)
 Trinità e Sartana figli di... di Mario Siciliano (1972) - The Tiger
 Un bianco vestito per Marialé (1972, directed by Romano Scavolini) - Sebastiano
 Amore e morte nel giardino degli dei (1972, directed by Sauro Scavolini) - Martin / Psychiatrist
 Alleluja e Sartana figli di... Dio (1972, directed by Mario Siciliano) - The Wolf
 The Assassination of Matteotti (1973, directed by Florestano Vancini) - Alcide De Gasperi
 La nipote (1974, directed by Nello Rossati) - Romeo-The Doctor
 I figli di nessuno (1974, directed by Bruno Gaburro)
 Challenge to White Fang (1974, directed by Lucio Fulci) - Gambler
 Terminal (1974, directed by Paolo Brecci)
 Il tempo dell'inizio (1974, directed by Luigi Di Gianni)
 L'ingenua (1975, directed by Gianfranco Baldanello) - Cornelio
 L'invenzione di Morel (1976, directed by Emidio Greco)
 La campagnola bella (1976, directed by Luca Delli Azzeri)
 Il signor ministro li prese tutti e subito (1977, directed by Sergio Alessandrini)
 I due superpiedi quasi piatti (1977, directed by E.B. Clucher) - Bloodsucker
 La belva col mitra (1977, directed by Sergio Grieco)
 Ridendo e scherzando (1978, directed by Marco Aleandri) - Chief of carabinieri
 Atsalut pater (1979, directed by Paolo Cavara) - Avv. Carrara
 Liberté, Égalité, Choucroute (1985, directed by Jean Yanne) - Un député
 Ginger and Fred (1986, directed by Federico Fellini) - The Intellectual
 Sposerò Simon Le Bon (1986, directed by Carlo Cotti)
 Abatjour 2 (1989) - (final film role)

Bibliography 
 Le teche Rai, la prosa televisiva dal 1954 al 2008
 Il Radiocorriere.
 Gli attori, Gremese editore Roma 2003

Italian male actors
Actors from Brescia
1991 deaths
1927 births